Heinrich Christian Jacobi (2 July 1866 – 3 March 1946) was a German architect and archaeologist, specialising in the Roman Empire. He was born and died in Homburg vor der Höhe.

Life
The son of Louis Jacobi (another archaeologist of the Roman Empire) and his wife Henriette Will. He studied architecture from 1886 to 1891 at the Technischen Hochschule Charlottenburg – during his studies he belonged to the Landsmannschaft Normannia fraternity. From 1895 to 1896 he led excavations in Adamclisi in Romania and travelled to see excavations of Roman sites in north Africa. He was later Regierungsbauführer (referendary) in Marburg, where in 1896 he became Regierungsbaumeister (Assessor). In 1899 the Prussian government gave him a job in Homburg vor der Höhe. There he became a member of the Royal Buildings Council (Königlichen Baurat) and State Building Inspector (Landesbauinspektor), both in 1911. The following year he succeeded his father as director of the Saalburgmuseum. He also collaborated with his father on the restoration of the Saalburg. He designed a Protestant Gedächtniskirche on the Weberstraße in the Kirdorf district of Bad Homburg – this opened on 18 August 1913.

His first marriage to Henriette Louise was childless, though they adopted a daughter, Hildegard, nicknamed Hilde. In autumn 1914 he became a Hauptmann of the Landwehr in the Ersatz-Bataillon of the 80th Fusilier Regiment in Wiesbaden. In 1915 he was put in command of a battalion of the 83rd Reserve Infantry Regiment in Homburg After the end of the First World War he resumed his duties as director of the Saalburgmuseum. After his first wife's death in 1925 he remarried in 1926 to Henriette Louise Johanna Trapp, daughter of Eduard Christian Trapp. 1926 also saw him receive an honorary doctorate. He held his post as director until 1936, well past the usual age limit, and took on the role again from 1945 to 1946.

Awards 
 Date unknown – Order of the Red Eagle, 4th class
 1915 – Iron Cross, 2nd class
 1916 – Hessische Tapferkeits-Medaille
 1917 – Order of Franz Joseph, officer's cross with war decoration, personally presented by Charles I of Austria
 1917 – Order of Saint Alexander, officer's cross with swords
 1918 – Bulgarian Medal for Science and Art
 1918 – Service Cross for War Assistance

Works 
 Das Erdkastell der Saalburg. Sonderdruck aus dem Saalburg Jahrbuch. Bericht des Saalburgmuseums VI. 1914/1924. Frankfurt 1924.
 Führer durch das Römerkastell Saalburg und Homburg vor der Höhe. Schudt, Homburg 1905. 7. Auflage 1913.
 Kleiner Führer durch die Saalburg und ihre Sammlungen. Taunusbote, Bad Homburg 1918.
 Führer durch die Saalburg und ihre Sammlungen. Taunusbote, Bad Homburg 1921. 27. Auflage 1927.
 Die Saalburg: Führer durch das Kastell und seine Sammlungen. Taunusbote, Bad Homburg 1929. 13. Auflage 1936.
 Die Homburger Eisenbahn und ihre Vorläufer. Sonderdruck des Taunusboten, Bad Homburg 1938.

Bibliography 
  Dieter Planck, Andreas Thiel (ed.s): Das Limes-Lexikon. Roms Grenzen von A bis Z. Beck, München 2009, S. 64.

References 

Archaeologists from Hesse
19th-century German architects
20th-century German architects
German classical scholars
People from Bad Homburg vor der Höhe
1866 births
1946 deaths
Directors of museums in Germany
Recipients of the Order of Franz Joseph
Recipients of the Iron Cross (1914), 2nd class
Classical archaeologists